This is a list of sailors who have started in at least one offshore leg of The Ocean Race.

Stu Bannatyne and Bouwe Bekking have both made eight appearances in the race.

A

B

C

D

E

F

G

H

I

J

K

L

M

N

O

P

Q

R

S

T

U

V

W

Y

Z

Notes

References

 

Volvo Ocean Race